The following highways are numbered 656:

Canada

United States